Graph Modeling Language (GML) is a hierarchical ASCII-based file format for describing graphs. It has been also named Graph Meta Language.

Example
A simple graph in GML format:
graph [
	comment "This is a sample graph"
	directed 1
	id 42
	label "Hello, I am a graph"
	node [
		id 1
		label "node 1"
		thisIsASampleAttribute 42
	]
	node [
		id 2
		label "node 2"
		thisIsASampleAttribute 43
	]
	node [
		id 3
		label "node 3"
		thisIsASampleAttribute 44
	]
	edge [
		source 1
		target 2
		label "Edge from node 1 to node 2"
	]
	edge [
		source 2
		target 3
		label "Edge from node 2 to node 3"
	]
	edge [
		source 3
		target 1
		label "Edge from node 3 to node 1"
	]
]

Applications supporting GML
 Cytoscape, an open source bioinformatics software platform for visualizing molecular interaction networks, loads and save previously-constructed interaction networks in GML.
 igraph, an open source network analysis library with interfaces to multiple programming languages.
 Gephi, an open source graph visualization and manipulation software.
 Graph-tool, a free Python module for manipulation and statistical analysis of graphs.
 NetworkX, an open source Python library for studying complex graphs.
 Social Network Visualizer (SocNetV), a free software application for social network analysis and visualization. SocNetV can load GML formatted text files.
 Tulip (software) is a free software in the domain of information visualisation capable of manipulating huge graphs (with more than 1.000.000 elements).
 yEd, a free Java-based graph editor, supports import from and export to GML.
 The Graphviz project includes two command-line tools (gml2gv and gv2gml) that can convert to and from the DOT file format.
 The Graph Template Library, a C++ library for graphs and algorithms, uses GML for import and export.
 A sample GML-parser written in C released under the LGPL.

See also 
 Graph Query Language (GQL)
 Json Graph https://github.com/jsongraph/json-graph-specification
 Unravelling Graph-Exchange File Formats, by Matthew Roughan and Jonathan Tuke, 2015, https://arxiv.org/pdf/1503.02781.pdf

References

External links
 GML: A portable Graph File Format, Michael Himsolt - 2010/11/30 (archived version)

Computer file formats
Graph description languages